Jeremiah N. Reynolds (fall 1799 – August 25, 1858), also known as J. N. Reynolds, was an American newspaper editor, lecturer, explorer and author who became an influential advocate for scientific expeditions. His lectures on the possibility of a hollow Earth appear to have influenced Edgar Allan Poe's The Narrative of Arthur Gordon Pym of Nantucket (1838), and Reynolds' 1839 account of the whale Mocha Dick, Mocha Dick: Or the White Whale of the Pacific, influenced Herman Melville's Moby-Dick (1851).

Early life
Born into poverty in Cumberland County Pennsylvania, he moved to Ohio as a child. In his teenage years and early 20s, he did farm labor, taught school, saved his money, and attended Ohio University in Athens, Ohio for three years. He then edited the Spectator newspaper in Wilmington, Ohio, but sold his interest in it in about 1823.

The next year, Reynolds began a lecture tour with John Cleves Symmes Jr. Reynolds had become a convert to Symmes' theory that the earth is hollow. The two presented talks on the subject. When Symmes died, Reynolds continued his lectures, which were given to full houses in eastern U.S. cities (with a charge of 50 cents for admission).

Over time, Reynolds became willing to accept the possibility that the theory was wrong. In Philadelphia, Reynolds and Symmes parted.

Adventures
Gaining the support of members of President John Quincy Adams' cabinet, and speaking before Congress, Reynolds succeeded in fitting out a national expedition to the South Pole. However, Andrew Jackson opposed the project, and after he became president it was squelched.

Reynolds garnered support from private sources, and the expedition sailed from New York City in 1829. Encountering much danger, the expedition reached the Antarctic shore and returned north, but at Valparaíso, Chile, the crew mutinied. The mutineers set Reynolds and the artist John Frampton Watson on shore, where they tramped for the next two years.

In 1832, the United States frigate Potomac, under Commodore John Downes, arrived. The ship had been ordered to the coast of Sumatra to avenge an attack on an American ship, Friendship, of Salem, Massachusetts, and was returning home in what became a circumnavigation of the globe. Reynolds joined Downes as his private secretary for the trip and wrote a book about the experience.

Later life
Back in New York City, Reynolds studied law and became a success as an advocate. In 1848 he organized a stock company in New York City for a New Mexico mining operation.

Reynolds missed joining the United States Exploring Expedition of 1838–1842, even though that venture was a result of his agitation. He did not participate because he had offended too many in his call for such a trip.

His health broke down and on August 25, 1858, at the age of 59, he died suddenly while visiting St. Catharine Springs, Canada.

Influence

In the January 1837 issue of the Southern Literary Messenger, Edgar Allan Poe reviewed Reynolds' "Address, on the Subject of a Surveying and Exploring Expedition to the Pacific Ocean and South Seas (New York, 1836) first given to the House of Representatives on April 2, 1836".

"Poe used some seven hundred words of Reynolds' Address in the fifteen hundred words of Chapter XVI of The Narrative of Arthur Gordon Pym", wrote Daniel Tynan of the Colorado College in an article about the Poe text, adding a synopsis of "sections from Chapter IV of Reynolds' Voyage and Chapter XIV of Pym, indicating to what extent Poe borrowed from Reynolds' book for his own purposes".

Tynan's assumption, however, that the "Mr. Reynolds" Poe praised (actually not in January 1837 in the SLM but only in September 1843 in Graham's Magazine, Vol. XXIV No. 3) as "the prime mover of this important undertaking", the United States Exploring Expedition, can be identified with Jeremiah N. Reynolds seems more than doubtful.

The Knickerbocker of May 1839 published "Mocha Dick: Or the White Whale of the Pacific", Reynolds' account of Mocha Dick, a white sperm whale off Chile who bedeviled a generation of whalers for thirty years before succumbing to one.

The novel Our Plague, A Film from New York (1993) by James Chapman includes scenes of Reynolds as a character, making his way in scientific circles and delivering a lecture in New York. Reynolds also appears in Félix J. Palma's The Map of the Sky.

Further reading

Reynolds, Jeremiah N., Voyage of the United States Frigate Potomac, New York: Harper and Brothers, 1835.
Reynolds, Jeremiah N. Mocha Dick: Or The White Whale of the Pacific. London and Glasgow: Cameron and Ferguson, 1870.
Reynolds, Jeremiah N. Mocha Dick, The White Whale of the Pacific. Illustrations by Lowell LeRoy Balcom. New York: Charles Scribner's Sons, 1932.
Philbrick, Nathaniel, Heart of the Sea
Almy, Robert F. "J. N. Reynolds: A Brief Biography with Particular Reference to Poe and Symmes." The Colophon 2 (1937): 227–245
Anonymous  "Death," Richmond Dispatch, August 30, 1858, p. 2.
Howe, Henry. "The Romantic History of Jeremiah N. Reynolds." Historical Collections of Ohio, vol 2. Cincinnati, 1889.
Sachs, Aaron, The Humboldt Current: Nineteenth Century Exploration and the Roots of American Environmentalism, (Viking, 2006), Reynolds is one of four Americans the author focuses on who were influenced by Alexander von Humboldt.
Garcin, Christian, Les vies multiples de Jeremiah Reynolds, novel (Stock, 2016)

Official papers on funding an expedition
Reynolds was mentioned in numerous documents related to the federal government's decisions to fund exploratory missions:

"On the Expediency of Fitting Out Vessels of the Navy for an Exploration of the Pacific Ocean and South Seas" (Washington: Gale's & Seaton, 1860):
1828: March 25, 1828,. American State Papers: Naval Affairs, Vol. 3, pp. 189–197
1829: February 23, 1829. American State Papers: Naval Affairs, Vol. 3, pp. 336–343.

From the same volume of the same title, but published in 1861:
 1835: February 7, 1835. American State Papers: Naval Affairs, Vol. 4, pp. 707–715.
 1836: March 21, 1836. American State Papers: Naval Affairs, Vol. 4, pp. 867–873.

Other, similar published collections of federal documents:
 1829: "Exploring Expedition to the Pacific Ocean and South Seas", February 16, 1829.. American State Papers: Naval Affairs, Vol. 3, pp. 308–317.
 1830: "Authorization of the Naval Exploring Expedition in the South Seas and Pacific Ocean, and of the Purchase of and Payment for Astronomical and Other Instruments for the Same", March 17, 1830.. American State Papers: Naval Affairs, Vol. 3, pp. 546–560.
(Washington: Gale's & Seaton, 1860)

Footnotes

External links
"The Romantic History of Jeremiah N. Reynolds" at the  "American Studies at the University of Virginia" Web site. This appears to be a reprint of Henry Howe's article of the same title, which appeared in Historical Collections of Ohio, Volume 2, Cincinnati (1889).
Reynold's 1828 Report on the Pacific to House of Representatives
J.N. Reynolds: "Mocha Dick: Or The White Whale of the Pacific", babel.hathitrust.org

1799 births
1858 deaths
American explorers
Explorers of Antarctica
American newspaper editors